Eric Foreman, M.D., is a fictional character on the Fox medical drama House. He is portrayed by Omar Epps, and appeared in all eight seasons of the show.

Background
A neurologist, Foreman was a member of Dr. Gregory House's handpicked team of specialists at Princeton-Plainsboro Teaching Hospital's Diagnostic Medicine Department. He was hired by House merely three days prior to the series' pilot episode (as implied in a deleted scene of the pilot).

Foreman attended Columbia University as an undergraduate before matriculating at the Johns Hopkins School of Medicine. In the pilot episode, he mentioned he had a 4.0 GPA through medical school, a fact confirmed by Dr. James Wilson in "Histories".

Little is known about Foreman's past, although it has been suggested that his family was quite underprivileged and his parents are currently living on a pension (cf. "Histories"). Foreman was also a former juvenile delinquent who once burglarized houses and stole cars. (House claims that this was a major factor in his decision to hire Foreman, that Foreman's delinquent past makes him useful in identifying misbehaving patients.) His father, Rodney (who appears in the episodes "Euphoria, Part 2" and "House Training"), is deeply religious, while his mother is unfit to travel, due to Alzheimer's disease; Foreman also has a brother, Marcus (played by Orlando Jones), who was incarcerated for drug possession until the season 6 episode "Moving the Chains".  Although he has a somewhat estranged relationship with his parents, the show depicts them as loving, though his father is emotionally distant.

By the end of the series (season 8), Foreman has become Dean of Medicine (replacing Cuddy) and one of the few people House trusts intimately. In the final scenes of the series, Foreman and Wilson are the only two people who know that House is still alive after everyone thinks he died in a fire: Foreman discovers an ID badge that House planted in his office as House and Wilson ride motorcycles to points unknown.

Character history 

In the episode "Euphoria, Part 1", Foreman became infected with a mysterious illness. Another patient, infected with the same condition, experiences a very painful death in front of Foreman. In desperation, and due to the effects of the illness, Foreman deliberately stabbed Cameron with an infected syringe to force her to do whatever needed to find a cure otherwise she would die too. In the conclusion of the episode, Cameron, acting as Foreman's medical proxy, performs a white-matter brain biopsy and the condition is revealed to be primary amoebic meningoencephalitis caused by Naegleria, a water-borne parasite that, upon being inhaled, attacks the brain.

When Michael Tritter offers Foreman an opportunity to win early parole for his drug-addicted, incarcerated brother, Marcus, Foreman turns it down. Tritter sees this as hypocrisy, citing Foreman's own criminal record, and says that while Foreman tries being compassionate to ward off House's training, he is actually just as cold and methodical as his employer. That is supported when Foreman gives his girlfriend a chance to go to a nurse practitioner school as a way to end the relationship, and she states that both he and House cannot stand to let people get close to them. He eventually gave his two weeks' notice to quit, as he was scared that he was turning apathetic towards patients' well-being—or as he admitted in the Season 3 finale, he does not want to turn into House. House angrily countered that he was like him, and in many ways was more selfish by caring about how good he looked in the eyes of patients and by dragging out his resignation until House admitted he wanted him to stay. Foreman left without a word following this tirade.

In the episode "The Right Stuff", Cuddy reveals that Foreman took a job at New York Mercy running the diagnostics department. In the episode "97 Seconds", it is shown that despite his desire to change, he is unable to break from House-like techniques, including using a whiteboard to brainstorm, but more importantly, disobeying the hospital administrator, believing that her idea is wrong and his idea will save the patient. The only difference is that since House is a known brilliant doctor, he has earned the trust that Foreman has not yet earned. So despite the fact that Foreman's idea is right, his boss states that Foreman had no way of proving that his idea was the correct one, and if she cannot trust Foreman to obey her, he cannot stay at the hospital. She then fires him.

Cuddy then offers Foreman his old job at Princeton-Plainsboro, claiming she needs someone to help control House. At first he declines the offer, but ultimately he accepts following an extensive series of failed job interviews. He finds that his insubordination at New York Mercy has led the medical community to conclude that House has trained him to be a loose cannon with no regard for authority or procedure... a "House Lite," as Cuddy describes it. He rejoins the department in the episode "Mirror Mirror", serving as Cuddy's eyes and ears on House's new team. Though House tries to make Foreman miserable enough to quit, Foreman soon realizes that the unorthodox and rapidly changing environment of House's diagnostics team is exactly where he wants to be, and the two return to speaking terms. Though House and Foreman are more confrontational than before due to Foreman's role as a buffer for House, House clearly still respects his skills, as is evidenced in "Whatever It Takes" when House chastises his fellows for not listening to Foreman.

In Season 5's episode "Let Them Eat Cake", Foreman runs a Huntington's drug trial and asks Thirteen to participate. In the next episode, "Joy to the World", Foreman and Thirteen kiss passionately, but in the following episode, she expresses her wish to keep some distance. However, they subsequently decide to pursue a romantic relationship. House repeatedly referred to them as "Foreteen," a collective nickname. In "Epic Fail", when House quits, Foreman takes over House's job and tries to treat a patient with Thirteen. Things get complicated and Foreman and Thirteen misdiagnose the patient, until Foreman realizes the right diagnosis and finds Thirteen stopped treatment as she came to the same conclusion based on an Internet suggestion (from House himself, though unknown to them). Foreman ends up firing Thirteen so he can continue dating her with no conflict of interest. In "The Tyrant", Chase forges test results for a patient who is an African dictator, leading to the patient's death. Foreman burns the papers that would have incriminated Chase.

At the beginning of season 8, it is revealed that Foreman has taken over Cuddy's job of Dean of Medicine at Princeton-Plainsboro, performing the role for 12 months while House has been in prison. Foreman hired House back into his old position upon his release from prison. In the season 6 episode "Epic Fail", Foreman took over as Head of the Diagnostic Department in House's absence. House was treated for psychosis and depression in Mayfield Psychiatric Hospital by Dr. Nolan, he was supposedly able to leave whenever he wanted because he had voluntarily entered the hospital. However, House's medical license was on the line and he was not able to leave without Dr. Nolan's approval letter to allow him to practice medicine again. To prevent Cuddy from shutting the department down, Foreman asked to fill the void that House had created. The stress of the job and newfound authority over his former co-workers caused a strain in the relationship between Foreman and Thirteen causing them to break up, as well as leading to Taub's resignation. In "Teamwork" House's medical licence is re-instated and he is given back his title as the Head of Diagnostic Medicine at Princeton-Plainsboro and Foreman had to take his job back as senior fellow on the Diagnostic team.

Personality

Despite his youthful offenses, Foreman initially may have been the best-adjusted of House's team. He is shown to possess a level of leadership skills, and was temporarily appointed House's supervisor by Cuddy in the second season (in "Deception", "Failure to Communicate" and "Need to Know"), during which time House referred to him as "Blackpoleon Blackaparte". It has also been implied that Foreman and House share certain characteristics (cf. "Poison"), both in terms of character and physical habits. Whether this is true is debatable, although in the episode "House Training", Foreman admits that he has problems with his own ego.

Like House, Foreman has also been shown to be extremely honest even at the cost of hurting other people's feelings. This is evident in the episode "Sleeping Dogs Lie", in which he tells Cameron that the two of them were never friends, merely working colleagues, after she falls out with him over his writing up an article on a previous case, knowing she was already writing her own, and getting House to sign off on it while hers lay unread, leading to his article's publication. However, during a later bout with a deadly illness (see below), Foreman recants this position. His sincerity, given his dying state, was unclear, and she initially refused his apology, but accepted when he was placed in a chemically induced coma. Similarly, in the episode "Resignation", he tells Chase that he has never liked him and never will. Despite these instances, later episodes such as "Wilson's Heart" and "Emancipation" demonstrate Cameron and Chase offering Foreman advice and support.

During Season Three, a change in Foreman's character, making him more sensitive to other people's feelings, can be noticed when he resists telling two interracial lovers that they are half-siblings in "Fools For Love". During the same episode, he is accused of being against interracial relationships. Foreman takes a bet with House, saying that Wilson is not dating a nurse in the hospital: the (white) nurse is actually dating Foreman, which explains his sensitivity to this particular case. Later, in "Needle in a Haystack", Foreman offers a Romani boy an interview for an intern job and tries to help him.

The season three episode "House Training" reveals a great deal about Foreman's character. Upon giving orders for a patient to be given immunosuppressing radiation treatment and then learning that it was nothing more than a staph infection (the radiation therapy killed the patient's immune system, essentially dooming her to a painful death), he is visibly agonized and blames himself for killing her. Throughout the episode Foreman displays a passionately emotional side and at one point breaks down, stating that in many ways he is no better than from where he came simply because his ego has gotten in the way. In the following episode, Foreman is seen for the first time praying or meditating in the hospital chapel, despite the fact that he had expressed being fairly nonreligious before.

Foreman was able to get over the grief and trauma of killing a patient, and the self-doubt that his mistake caused, when he was able to save another patient's life by taking extreme measures in "Family". With a young boy dying unless he got a bone marrow transplant immediately, Foreman was forced to get the marrow from the patient's little brother, without anesthetizing the boy first as he was too sick to be sedated. Foreman strapped the boy down to a bed and drew the marrow from him by force in several places on his body to get the samples he needed, ignoring the boy's screams of agony in order to do so. The patient survived as a result, and while Foreman acknowledged this, he was also horrified with what he had done. He tendered his resignation the same day.

Foreman takes a job at Mercy Hospital in New York, and he immediately goes out of his way to conduct differential diagnoses with a calm head and professional attitude, almost the exact opposite of House.  However, when a patient presents with a condition with similar symptoms to the patient he killed, Foreman goes against regulations (like House) to save the patient's life, which he does. Despite making a life-saving call, Foreman's administrator fires him due to violating regulations.  Foreman is then re-hired by Cuddy to serve as a partner of sorts with House and to act as the "eyes and ears" of Cuddy on House's team. His position is permanent, as he cannot be hired anywhere else. His personality appears to have changed drastically since being re-hired and has become distinctly sarcastic and biting, and although he shows some level of restraint, his sense of humor has become very similar to that of House. He nevertheless states that he enjoys being back at PPTH and working with House again.

Significantly, as he did during his temporary stint as House's supervisor in season 2, Foreman has picked up House's habit of practicing medicine in plain clothes, eschewing the white coat he wore during his first hitch as a member of House's team. However, his outfit is still more professional than House's, tending toward well-tailored suits with ties, and he is frequently seen wearing waistcoats when not in surgery.

In his romantic life, Foreman is shown to have intimacy issues. His relationship with a PPTH nurse named Wendy - between season 3's "Fools For Love" and "Insensitive" - ends with her breaking up with him as he will not truly allow her to get close. Having begun a relationship with teammate Thirteen in  season 5, his issues are highlighted in "Simple Explanation", where he admits and demonstrates to her that he works through major emotional stress alone, although he later makes a point not to entirely shut her out. In the following episode, "Saviors", teammate Dr. Chris Taub deduces from a conversation with Thirteen that Foreman does not open up much to her in private.

After comments from House about his general lack of spontaneity in "Lucky Thirteen", Foreman voices concerns to Chase that he is "boring," to which Chase offers that Foreman is too controlled regarding the events in his life, which prevents him from pushing his limits. In a moment between Taub and Thirteen during "The Softer Side", Taub mocks Foreman for having a robotic manner, comparing him to the fictional android character, the T-1000 from "Terminator 2: Judgment Day."

Foreman is a fan of jazz music, first shown in the episode "Who's Your Daddy?", when Foreman makes a Miles Davis reference, and later in the episode "Insensitive", where he plans to attend a jazz festival.

Relationship with House
In the first two seasons, House's relationship with Foreman was probably the least complicated of the relationships he has with his fellows. While Foreman is considered to dislike his boss ("DNR"), constantly challenges House's behaviour and diagnoses, and terms him "an anarchist" ("Deception") and "a manipulative bastard" ("Euphoria, Part 2"), he genuinely respects House's medical expertise and House seems to appreciate Foreman's professionalism.  Although House frequently targets Foreman with racist jokes, Foreman does not appear to take them personally—it seems that House uses Foreman's race as a source of humor simply because Foreman's race is an easy target, just as House often targets Chase with his nationality and Cameron with her gender, and other episodes (cf. "Humpty Dumpty") establish that House is not racially prejudiced.  In the episode "Family", Foreman fears that he has begun to disregard his patients' lives much the way House does, and he decides that he'd rather leave his job than continue on that path. In the third-season finale, House makes a last attempt to keep Foreman from leaving, but it fails.

Although House stated in the pilot that he hired Foreman because he was an ex-car thief, House often states or implies that he thinks Foreman is a great doctor.  The best example of this is in the Season 2 Episode "Autopsy".  House and the surgical team are trying to determine the exact location of a blood clot in order to be able to remove it. Foreman swears he spotted a clot on the screen that neither House nor anybody else saw. House nods and states "That's good enough for me." Also, in the third-season finale "Human Error", when House is trying to stop Foreman's leaving, he bluntly declares that he is "indispensable" and that "he needs him" on his team, in an unusual display of respect for a subordinate.

Following Foreman's return to Princeton-Plainsboro Hospital, it is shown that House still holds a great deal of respect for Foreman. In stark contrast to previous seasons, he tends to treat Foreman as an equal in his understanding of diagnostics and Foreman in return shows a marked regret at having quit the job in the first place. In "Whatever It Takes", House reprimands his new fellowship candidates when they fail to listen to Foreman's instructions while House is away. House tells the candidates that the reason he left Foreman in charge was because Foreman knows what he's doing and that they should listen to him next time. Later, in "No More Mr. Nice Guy" Foreman believes he is not getting the respect he deserves from Kutner, Taub and Thirteen when he tries, and fails, to do their performance reviews, which he believes is due to House frequently humiliating him. House replies that if he did not humiliate and taunt Foreman, he would not be strong and able enough to handle the rest of the team. In future episodes, Foreman was considered to be in charge whenever House is unavailable. He is also the primary attending physician whenever House is legally unable to do so, such as when House's license was suspended at the beginning of season 6, or when House was recovering from a bus crash and drug overdose while diagnosing Amber.

In the final episode of the series (season 8), "Everybody Dies", Foreman and Wilson are the only two people who are aware that House did not die: House faked his death in order to spend time with Wilson (who was diagnosed with terminal cancer), and as they ride off together, Foreman finds House's hospital ID badge being used to support a shaky table in his office they had argued over earlier and slowly realizes that House is alive.

References

External links

 Eric Foreman on TVIV

House (TV series) characters
Fictional African-American people
Fictional physicians
Television characters introduced in 2004